The 1989–90 Iraqi National Clubs First Division was the 16th season of the competition since its foundation in 1974. The name of the league was changed from Iraqi Pan-National Clubs First Division back to Iraqi National Clubs First Division and it was organised by the Iraq Football Association (IFA). Al-Tayaran (now known as Al-Quwa Al-Jawiya) achieved their second Premier League title, having previously won the inaugural title in the 1974–75 season.

League table

Results

Season statistics

Top scorers

Hat-tricks

References

External links
 Iraq Football Association

Iraqi Premier League seasons
1989–90 in Iraqi football
Iraq